Bernardino Serrano Mori (born 29 January 1963 in Antromero, Asturias), known as Mino, is a Spanish former footballer who played as a central defender.

Honours
Real Madrid
La Liga: 1986–87, 1987–88

Español
Segunda División: 1993–94

References

External links

1963 births
Living people
Spanish footballers
Footballers from Asturias
Association football defenders
La Liga players
Segunda División players
Segunda División B players
Sporting de Gijón B players
Sporting de Gijón players
Real Madrid CF players
Sevilla FC players
RCD Espanyol footballers
RCD Mallorca players
CD Logroñés footballers
Spanish football managers